Award Tour II is the second extended play by American rapper Mike G. It was released on January 26, 2015, by Odd Future Records.

Release and promotion
On January 19, 2015, the first single, "Highlights", was released, along with the track listing and release date. On January 26, 2015, a music video for "Archer" was released. On October 9, 2015, a music video for "Jameson" was released.

Track listing

 
Notes
 "Jameson" contains vocal samples from "Burgundy" performed by Earl Sweatshirt

References
 

2015 EPs
Albums produced by Mac Miller
Albums produced by Left Brain
Albums produced by Earl Sweatshirt
Albums produced by Tyler, the Creator
Odd Future Records albums